The Old Fox (original German title "Der Alte", lit. "The Old One") is a German crime drama series created by Helmut Ringelmann. It premiered on 11 April 1977 on ZDF. Since 1978 the series is part of the Friday Crime Night of the network.

It depicts the crime solving activities of four police detectives: until 1985, Chief Inspector Erwin Köster, played by Siegfried Lowitz; from 1977 to 1986, Chief Inspector Leo Kress, played by Rolf Schimpf; from 1986 to 2007, Chief Inspector Rolf Herzog, played by Walter Kreye; from 2008 to 2012 and from 2012, Chief Inspector Richard Voss, played by Jan-Gregor Kremp.

Humble and unassuming in appearance, chief detective Köster is the "Old Fox". By understanding the psychological make-up of his suspect, the "Old Fox" craftily leads the criminal into his own trap, to the great surprise of his often perplexed staff. The "Old Fox" has his own way of working. Wearied by the negative elements he has witnessed so often in society, the "Old Fox" provides a unique insight into human nature.

Armed with the wisdom of age and experience, the "Old Fox" hunts down criminals in Munich, assisted by his colleagues, most notably Gerd Heymann, played by Michael Ande between 1977 and 2016 in 401 episodes. The actors or actresses of other assistant characters over the years include Jan Hendriks, Markus Böttcher, Marlene Morreis, Pierre Sanoussi-Bliss, Ludwig Blochberger and Stephanie Stumph.

See also
Der Kommissar
Derrick

References

External links
 
 ZDF Der Alte 
Der Alte-Spoiler 

German drama television series
German crime television series
1970s German police procedural television series
1980s German police procedural television series
1990s German police procedural television series
2000s German police procedural television series
2010s German police procedural television series
2020s German police procedural television series
1980s German television series
1990s German television series
2000s German television series
2010s German television series
1977 German television series debuts
German-language television shows
ZDF original programming